The 1970 California Angels season involved the Angels finishing third in the American League West with a record of 86 wins and 76 losses.

Offseason 
 October 22, 1969: Rubén Amaro Sr. was released by the Angels.
 October 24, 1969: Mel Queen was purchased by the Angels from the Cincinnati Reds.
 November 25, 1969: Pedro Borbón, Vern Geishert and Jim McGlothlin were traded by the Angels to the Cincinnati Reds for Alex Johnson and Chico Ruiz.
 January 14, 1970: Bill Harrelson and Dan Loomer (minors) were traded by the Angels to the Cincinnati Reds for Jack Fisher.

Regular season

Season standings

Record vs. opponents

Notable transactions 
 April 7, 1970: Jack Fisher was released by the Angels.
 April 27, 1970: Aurelio Rodríguez and Rick Reichardt were traded by the Angels to the Washington Senators for Ken McMullen.
 June 4, 1970: Mike Krukow was drafted by the Angels in the 32nd round of the 1970 Major League Baseball draft, but did not sign.
 August 31, 1970: Tony González was purchased by the Angels from the Atlanta Braves.

Roster

Player stats

Batting

Starters by position 
Note: Pos = Position; G = Games played; AB = At bats; H = Hits; Avg. = Batting average; HR = Home runs; RBI = Runs batted in

Other batters 
Note: G = Games played; AB = At bats; H = Hits; Avg. = Batting average; HR = Home runs; RBI = Runs batted in

Pitching

Starting pitchers 
Note: G = Games pitched; IP = Innings pitched; W = Wins; L = Losses; ERA = Earned run average; SO = Strikeouts

Other pitchers 
Note: G = Games pitched; IP = Innings pitched; W = Wins; L = Losses; ERA = Earned run average; SO = Strikeouts

Relief pitchers 
Note: G = Games pitched; W = Wins; L = Losses; SV = Saves; ERA = Earned run average; SO = Strikeouts

Farm system 

LEAGUE CHAMPIONS: Idaho Falls

Notes

References 
1970 California Angels team at Baseball-Reference
1970 California Angels team page at www.baseball-almanac.com

Los Angeles Angels seasons
California Angels season
Los